Puckett is a surname of French Huguenot origin, an anglicized form of French surnames such as Pouquette or Pouquet meaning "the son of Pouque" or Puck. It is found mostly in North America and the British Isles with the mass emigration of Huguenot families following the St. Bartholomew's Day massacre.

People
 Aaron Jennings Puckett (born 1994), American rapper known as Lil Aaron
 Casey Puckett (born 1972), American alpine skier
 Charlie Puckett (1911–2002), Australian baseballer and cricketer
 Clinton A. Puckett (1926–2002), American Marine, 6th Sergeant Major of the United States Marine Corps
 Elliott Puckett, American drag queen
 Gary Puckett (born 1942), lead singer of Gary Puckett & The Union Gap, an American rock band from the 1960s
 Joel Puckett (born 1977), American composer of concert music
 Kirby Puckett (1960–2006), American baseball player
 Matthew Puckett, American songwriter
 Max Puckett (1935–1991), Australian baseballer and cricketer
 Miller Puckette (born 1959), American academic
 Phillip Puckett (born 1947), American politician, Virginia state senator
 Ralph Puckett (born 1926), United States Army Ranger in the Korean War
 Riley Puckett (1894–1946), American country music pioneer
 Tim Puckett (born 1962), American amateur astronomer

Fictional characters
Sam Puckett (iCarly), from the TV show iCarly
Sam Puckett (Sam & Cat), from the TV show Sam & Cat
Red Puckett, from the movie Hoodwinked!

References

French-language surnames